Rick Maddocks (born 1970) is a Canadian author and singer/songwriter. Born in Wales, he moved to Canada with his family in the early 1980s.

His short story collection Sputnik Diner (Random House, 2002) was nominated for the Danuta Gleed Literary Award.  Its first story, "Plane People", won Prairie Fire'''s Long Fiction Competition as well as a Western Magazine Award, and "Lessons from the Sputnik Diner" was a shortlisted finalist for the Journey Prize. He was the editor of the literary magazine Event, published by Douglas College, from 2006 to September 2010.

Maddocks is the leader of Vancouver jazz/pop quintet The Beige. The band have released two albums, 01 (2006) and El Ángel Exterminador'' (2010).

References

1970 births
Canadian male short story writers
Living people
Canadian people of Welsh descent
Writers from Vancouver
Musicians from Vancouver
Canadian pop singers
Canadian songwriters
21st-century Canadian short story writers
21st-century Canadian male writers
21st-century Canadian male singers